Nagia is a genus of moths of the family Erebidae. The genus was erected by Francis Walker in 1858.

Species
Nagia amplificans (Walker, 1858)
Nagia dentiscripta A. E. Prout, 1921
Nagia episcopalis Hampson, 1926
Nagia evanescens Hampson, 1926
Nagia godfreyi Tams, 1924
Nagia gravipes Walker, 1858
Nagia homotona Hampson, 1926
Nagia linteola (Guenee, 1852)
Nagia melipotica Hampson, 1926
Nagia microsema Hampson, 1926
Nagia monosema Hampson, 1926
Nagia natalensis (Hampson, 1902)
Nagia promota (Pagenstecher, 1907)
Nagia pseudonatalensis (Strand, 1912)
Nagia runa (Swinhoe, 1902)
Nagia sacerdotis Hampson, 1926
Nagia sthenistica Hampson, 1926
Nagia subalbida Hampson, 1926
Nagia subterminalis Wileman & South, 1921
Nagia vadoni Viette, 1968

Taxonomy
The genus is treated as a synonym of Catephia by some authors.

References

External links

 
Catephiini
Moth genera